Doctor Babu is a Telugu language film released in 1973. It starred Sobhan Babu and Jayalalitha in lead roles. It is romantic social drama film. The film was a remake of Hindi film Himalay Ki Godmein.

Cast
 Sobhan Babu as Sekhar
 Jayalalitha as Gauri
 Rajanala
 Gummadi as Narayana Rao
 S.V. Ranga Rao as Mallu Dora
 Raja Babu as Chikkadu
 Allu Ramalingaiah as Devayya
 Mukkamala as Dharmanna
Relangi as Jagannatha Rao
G. Varalakshmi as Parvathi
Vijayalalitha as Leela
K.K. Sarma as Thimmaraju
Chalapathi Rao
Gokina Rama Rao
Nagesh (special appearance in a song)

Soundtrack

References

External links
 

1973 films
1970s Telugu-language films
Telugu remakes of Hindi films
Films scored by T. Chalapathi Rao